Frank Landy (born May 24, 1950) is a Canadian football player who played professionally for the Saskatchewan Roughriders, BC Lions and Toronto Argonauts.

References

1950 births
Living people
Saskatchewan Roughriders players
North Dakota Fighting Hawks football players